Sidestreet is a Canadian television drama, which aired Sundays on CBC from 1975 to 1978. It stars Sean McCann and Donnelly Rhodes as police working in Toronto.

Background
Sidestreet succeeded The Collaborators as the CBC's main series drama. Program developers aimed to move Sidestreet away from the violence that The Collaborators had by focusing on protagonists who were community service officers instead of ordinary detectives. They aimed to concentrate on issues such as: blockbusting, strikebreaking, rape, poverty, and the problems of the elderly in the city, instead of major crimes.

Theme song
Jazz musician Chuck Mangione composed the show's theme song. The two-minute theme appears on his 1977 hit album Feels So Good.

External links

Queen's University Directory of CBC Television Series

1970s Canadian crime drama television series
Canadian police procedural television series
CBC Television original programming
1975 Canadian television series debuts
1978 Canadian television series endings
Television shows set in Toronto